is a former Japanese football player.

Club statistics

References

External links

J. League

1983 births
Living people
Ryutsu Keizai University alumni
Association football people from Gunma Prefecture
Japanese footballers
J2 League players
Japanese expatriate footballers
Mito HollyHock players
Fukushima United FC players
Association football forwards